Great Bend Station was an Atchison, Topeka and Santa Fe Railway station in Great Bend, Kansas. The station was along Santa Fe's main line between Chicago and Los Angeles. It was on the "northern branch" of the main line as it split in Hutchinson, Kansas. It was also served by a line the ran to Garden City, Kansas, travelling through Ness City and Scott City. Both of these lines are now operated by the Kansas and Oklahoma Railroad. The depot was built in a Mission Revival, common for Santa Fe and Southern Pacific stations in the late 19th and early 20th centuries. Although passenger service is long gone, the depot still stands vacant and boarded up.

References

External links
Great Bend, KS depot

Atchison, Topeka and Santa Fe Railway stations
Buildings and structures in Barton County, Kansas
Railway stations in the United States opened in 1910
Former railway stations in Kansas